Jake Holden (born September 25, 1987) is a Canadian snowboarder. He competed primarily in snowboard cross. Holden represented Canada in this event at the 2014 Winter Olympics in Sochi, placing fourth in his heat. Jake retired after the 2014 Olympics due to lingering injuries.  In 2018 Jake was named assistant coach to the Canadian National Snowboardcross Team, he now shares head coaching duties with former 2010 Olympic gold medalist Maelle Ricker . In the off-season Jake runs his own business specializing in European stone work.

References

1987 births
Living people
Canadian male snowboarders
Sportspeople from British Columbia
Snowboarders at the 2014 Winter Olympics
Olympic snowboarders of Canada